Events from the year 1202 in Ireland.

Incumbent
Lord: John

Events
 Cathal Crobhdearg Ua Conchobair succeeds Cathal Carragh Ua Conchobair as King of Connacht.

Births

Deaths
 Cathal Carragh Ua Conchobair, King of Connacht.

 
1200s in Ireland
Ireland
Years of the 13th century in Ireland